Baptizm of Fire is the debut solo album by Judas Priest guitarist Glenn Tipton released in 1997. Atlantic released the album on February 17, 1997.

Background
It was recorded and mixed at Devonshire and Ocean Studios, U.S.A. and Monnow Valley, Battery, Olympic, and The Gazebo Studio, UK. Writing and recording took place in the years 1994 to 1996, with management done by Bill Curbishley and Co-ordination done by Jayne Andrews.

Mostly due to conflicting time schedules with the end of production and subsequent promotion of the Judas Priest comeback with lead singer Tim "Ripper" Owens and the release of the album Jugulator in October 1997, Baptizm of Fire has not been presented on a live tour.

Track listing

Personnel
Glenn Tipton – all guitars and vocals, bass on track 13
Robert Trujillo – bass on tracks 1, 2, 10
C.J. de Villar – bass on tracks 3, 4, 8, 9, 11
Billy Sheehan – bass on tracks 5, 6
John Entwistle – bass on track 7
Neil Murray – bass on track 12
Brooks Wackerman – drums on tracks 1, 2, 10
Shannon Larkin – drums on tracks 3, 4, 8, 9, 11
Cozy Powell – drums on tracks 5, 6, 7, 12
Rick Tipton – drums on track 13
Don Airey – keyboards on track 6
Whitfield Crane – backing vocals on track 10

Production
Produced and mixed by Glenn Tipton and Mark Dodson
Engineered and mixed by Sean Lynch
Mastered by Greg Calbi
Original design by Larry Freemantle
Cover illustration and reissue design by Mark Wilkinson
Photography by Amy Guip and Ray Palmer

References

External links 
 http://www.glenntipton.com
 http://www.judaspriest.com

1997 debut albums
Glenn Tipton albums
Atlantic Records albums